Cleidimar Magalhães Silva (born 10 September 1982 in Itabira, Minas Gerais), commonly known as Didi, is a retired Brazilian footballer who played as a striker.

Honours

Player
CFR Cluj
Liga I: 2007–08, 2009–10
Cupa României: 2007–08, 2008–09, 2009–10
Supercupa României: 2009

References

External links
 
 
 
 
 

1982 births
Living people
Brazilian footballers
Association football forwards
Santa Cruz Futebol Clube players
Esporte Clube Juventude players
F.C. Marco players
CFR Cluj players
Leixões S.C. players
ASA 2013 Târgu Mureș players
ASC Oțelul Galați players
Brazilian expatriate footballers
Expatriate footballers in Romania
Expatriate footballers in Portugal
Liga I players
Primeira Liga players